Wu Jieping (22 January 1917 – 2 March 2011) was a Chinese medical scientist and politician. Wu was the Chairman of Central Committee of Jiusan Society from 1992 to 2002, and a Vice-chairman of the National People's Congress Standing Committee between 1993 and 2003. Wu was a member of the Chinese Academy of Sciences and a fellow of the World Academy of Sciences.

Biography 
Wu was born Wu Tairan in Wujin County, Jiangsu, on January 22, 1917, the second of four sons of Wu Jingyi, a Chinese businessman. His elder brother Wu Ruiping and younger brothers Wu Weiran and Wu Anran are also medical scientist. Wu was raised in Tianjin. He earned a Bachelor of Science degree from Yenching University in 1937 and a Doctor of Medicinae degree from Peking Union Medical College in 1942. He studied urology under Xie Yuanfu. He was accepted to University of Chicago in 1947.

After the founding of Communist State, he worked at Peking University Health Science Center. In 1951, he and his medical teams participated in the Korean War. Wu joined the Communist Party of China in 1956. In 1980, he was elected a fellow of the Chinese Academy of Sciences. He served as vice-chairman of Central Committee of Jiusan Society in 1989, and three years later promoted to the chairman position. In 1993 he was promoted to become the vice-chairman of the Standing Committee of the National People's Congress, a position he held until 2003. On February 28, 2000, the Wu Jieping Medical Foundation was founded in Beijing.

Wu died in Beijing on March 2, 2011.

Personal life 
Wu was twice married. He married his first wife Zhao Junkai at the age of 16 when he was a student in Yenching University, she died in 1978. A few years later, he married Gao Rui.

References

External links 
 The Wu Jieping Medical Foundation

1917 births
2011 deaths
Chinese urologists
Members of the Chinese Academy of Sciences
Members of the Jiusan Society
Vice Chairpersons of the National People's Congress
Peking Union Medical College alumni
People's Republic of China politicians from Jiangsu
Scientists from Changzhou
TWAS fellows
University of Chicago alumni
Yenching University alumni
Politicians from Changzhou
Chinese Communist Party politicians from Jiangsu